Beethoven's Big Break (formerly known as Beethoven: The Reel Story and sometimes referred to as Beethoven's 6th) is a 2008 American family film and is the sixth installment in the Beethoven series. It was released on DVD on December 30, 2008. The film could be considered a reboot of the series, as it completely disregards all storylines from the previous five films, though some scenes in this film include references to the original storyline.

Plot
Eddie, a struggling animal trainer and widowed father, is an assistant animal trainer to Sal DeMarco, an untalented, egocentric animal show host. Both men have been hired to train the animals for a film called Frizzy, The Bichon Frise: Sal as the dog handler, and Eddie is given only the responsibility of training the lizard. When Frizzy is kidnapped, Sal blames Eddie for being responsible for the dog handling. Eddie is promptly fired by the severe producer Patricia. The director Stanley and Patricia refuse to pay the ransom and they decide to instead hold auditions for the new Frizzy.

Meanwhile, Eddie's son, Billy, is walking around town when he discovers a large, stray dog is following him. Billy then brings the dog home and names him Beethoven when the dog shows interest in Ludwig van Beethoven's 5th symphony, after initially trying to call him Wolfgang. Eddie comes home to discover that, not only is his job gone, but now his house is wrecked by an oversized dog adopted by his son.

It transpires that the one responsible for Frizzy's disappearance is Sal, accompanied by his two other cronies Tick and Bones. He admonishes them for not waiting until Frizzy had already shot some of the movie, in order to make her valuable.

The next day, when auditions are held, Stanley and Patricia have difficulties finding the right dog to replace Frizzy. Eddie has arrived (with Billy and Beethoven in-tow) to pick up his lizard, Pete. Suddenly, Beethoven bursts in and performs an impressive chase scene with Pete the Lizard, which instantly makes Stanley love him. Beethoven and Eddie are hired on the spot and Sal is fired by Stanley.

To celebrate, Eddie takes Billy and Beethoven out for hamburgers, but Beethoven escapes with the burgers and leads Eddie and Billy on a chase. Finally, they find where Beethoven was going: he had been caring for his three small pups in an alley, as their mother had apparently died. In Beethoven's 2nd, she was not heard from again. Eddie begrudgingly adopts the puppies, as well.

Eddie is then charged with having Beethoven perform the requested stunts in the movie. Unfortunately, Beethoven proves to be "untrainable", and instead, often crashes through the scene and making a sloppy mess in the process. Each time, Eddie is prepared to be fired, but Stanley finds these scenes even funnier and orders the scenes printed for the film. Lisa, the film's writer, requests from Eddie to spend more time with Beethoven so that she can write more appropriately for him.

As revenge for being fired from the studio, Sal orders his henchmen to kidnap Beethoven for the million-dollar ransom, planning to kill him after the ransom is paid. They kidnap him while Billy is flirting with his crush Katie in the park. Eddie, Billy, Lisa and the puppies then head to Sal's show stage, which doubles as his secret lair, and rescue Beethoven. Sal and his goons are arrested, and Eddie and Lisa begin a relationship.

The film ends with Eddie, Lisa, Billy, Katie, Stanley, Patricia, Beethoven, the pups, and Pete the iguana, all enjoying pop corn while watching the film's premiere.

The end credits have movie title parodies. These include "Dog-E", "When Hairy Met Frizzy" and "The Lizard of Oz". During the Gag Reel, Jonathan Silverman refers to Sal DeMarco as "Ned Ryerson". This is because the actor who played Sal, Stephen Tobolowsky, portrayed the character Ned Ryerson in the Bill Murray comedy, Groundhog Day.

Cast 
 A St. Bernard as Beethoven
 Jonathan Silverman as Eddie Thornton "Lizard Guy"
 Jennifer Finnigan as Lisa Waters
 Moises Arias as Billy Thornton
 Eddie Griffin as Stanley Mitchell
 Rhea Perlman as Patricia Benji
 Stephen Tobolowsky as Sal DeMarco
 Oscar Nunez as Tick
 Joey Fatone as Bones
 Stefanie Scott as Katie
 Cesar Millan as himself
 John Augello as Studio Executive
 Grant Elliott as George Newton
 Zach Kosnitzky as Lewis
 Ali Eagle as Craft Service Person
 Adam Vernier as Marco

Reception
Common Sense Media rated it 3 out of 5 stars.  Kevin Carr, writing for 7M Pictures said the film, "offers plenty of slapstick moments and a fair share of burps and farts, which make the movie a sure-fire hit for young kids."

References

External links
Beethoven's Big Break at the Internet Movie Database

2008 comedy films
2008 films
American comedy films
Direct-to-video sequel films
Films about animals
Films about dogs
Films about pets
Films scored by Robert Folk
Reboot films
Universal Pictures direct-to-video films
2008 directorial debut films
Beethoven (franchise)
Films directed by Mike Elliott
2000s English-language films
2000s American films